Audubon Township is a township in Becker County, Minnesota, United States.  The population was 416 at the 2000 census.

History
Audubon Township was organized in 1871. It was named after naturalist John James Audubon.

Geography

The city of Audubon is entirely within this township geographically but is a separate entity.

Major highway
  U.S. Route 10

Lakes
 Audubon Lake
 Barne Lake
 Barnes Lake
 Berseth Lake
 Bluebird Lake
 Boardson Lake
 Boyer Lake (east quarter)
 Canary Lake
 Cravath Lake (south half)
 Dahlberg Lake (northeast edge)
 Gilbertson Lake
 Joy Lake
 Larson Lake
 Leaf Lake (northeast edge)
 Little Cormorant Lake (vast majority)
 Lake Minnetonka
 Marshall Lake
 Mc Kinstry Lake
 Reep Lake
 Robin Lake

Adjacent townships
 Hamden Township (north)
 Richwood Township (northeast)
 Detroit Township (east)
 Lake View Township (southeast)
 Lake Eunice Township (south)
 Cormorant Township (southwest)
 Lake Park Township (west)
 Cuba Township (northwest)

Cemeteries
The township contains these four cemeteries: Audubon, Cook Family, Felker and Immanuel.

Demographics
As of the census of 2000, there were 416 people, 162 households, and 129 families residing in the township.  The population density was 12.9 people per square mile (5.0/km2).  There were 224 housing units at an average density of 6.9/sq mi (2.7/km2).  The racial makeup of the township was 97.12% White, 0.72% Native American, and 2.16% from two or more races.

There were 162 households, out of which 32.1% had children under the age of 18 living with them, 69.1% were married couples living together, 7.4% had a female householder with no husband present, and 19.8% were non-families. 18.5% of all households were made up of individuals, and 8.0% had someone living alone who was 65 years of age or older.  The average household size was 2.57 and the average family size was 2.88.

In the township the population was spread out, with 28.1% under the age of 18, 4.3% from 18 to 24, 25.0% from 25 to 44, 28.1% from 45 to 64, and 14.4% who were 65 years of age or older.  The median age was 39 years. For every 100 females, there were 95.3 males.  For every 100 females age 18 and over, there were 102.0 males.

The median income for a household in the township was $40,000, and the median income for a family was $46,458. Males had a median income of $25,179 versus $28,750 for females. The per capita income for the township was $20,650.  About 4.9% of families and 9.3% of the population were below the poverty line, including 14.9% of those under age 18 and 14.0% of those age 65 or over.

References
 United States National Atlas
 United States Census Bureau 2007 TIGER/Line Shapefiles
 United States Board on Geographic Names (GNIS)

Townships in Becker County, Minnesota
Townships in Minnesota